El Haimoune  (Arabic: الهائمون / Al-Haymun, meaning: The Wanderers) (English: Wanderers of the Desert) is a 1984 film by Tunisian writer and director Nacer Khemir. It is the first part of Khemir's "Desert Trilogy" that also includes "The Dove's lost necklace" and Bab'Aziz. It stars Nacer Khemir, Soufiane Makni, Noureddine Kasbaoui, Hedi Daoud, and Sonia Ichti. It was filmed in Tunisia.

Synopsis 
El Haimoune is a Sufi tale, a film based on a poem, a quest for roots, love and freedom. A young teacher arrives at a village built on the border of the desert where children have never been to school. Apart from the children, the village is inhabited by elderly men, women, and a mysterious and beautiful young girl. The men left to seek the boundaries of the limitless desert. The teacher is finally captivated by the shimmering world of sand and the Andalusia melody of its wanderers. In this story, magic and reality overlap to sing the beauty of the desert. The filmmaker, through carefully planned shots and sequences, which are treated like paintings, and the poetry of his writing, pays an homage to the splendour of Arabian culture.

Cast
 Nacer Khemir: Lehrer
 Soufiane Makni: Houcine
 Noureddine Kasbaoui: Greffier
 Sonia Ichti: Tochter/Fille du Cheikh
 Abdeladhim Abdelhak: Hadj
 Hedi Daoud: Cheikh
 Hassen Khalsi: Officier de police
 Jamila Ourabi: Grossmutter
 Hamadi Laghmani: Spieler/Joueur

Release
El Haimoune DVD was released on March 25, 2008. It's in Arabic language with English subtitles.

Awards 
 Trois Continents, Nantes 1984
 Mostra de Valencia 1984
 Cartago 1984

References

External links
 
 

1984 films
Tunisian drama films